Fernando López Fernández (born 22 June 1983 in Madrid) is a Spanish professional footballer who last played for Porriño Industrial FC as a goalkeeper.

External links
Košice official profile

1983 births
Living people
Footballers from Madrid
Spanish footballers
Association football goalkeepers
Segunda División players
Segunda División B players
Tercera División players
Divisiones Regionales de Fútbol players
Rayo Vallecano players
UD Las Palmas Atlético players
CD Linares players
Córdoba CF B players
Córdoba CF players
CD Atlético Baleares footballers
Lucena CF players
Coruxo FC players
Livingston F.C. players
Slovak Super Liga players
FC VSS Košice players
Spanish expatriate footballers
Expatriate footballers in Scotland
Expatriate footballers in Slovakia
Spanish expatriate sportspeople in Slovakia